Abū ʿAbd Allāh Fayrūz al-Daylamī (Persian: فیروز دیلمی, Firuz the Daylamite) was a Persian companion of the Islamic prophet Muhammad. He belonged to the descendants (abna') of Persians that had been sent by Khosrow I to Yemen, conquered it, and drove out the Abyssinians.

After Aswad Ansi claimed prophethood in Yemen, proceeded to invade Najran and much of Yemen, attacking Sana'a and the ruler of Yemen and Shahr, who along with the son of Badhan was killed in battle against Aswad, Fayruz was sent out by Muhammad to kill him. In reference to this, in al-Tabari's History, Muhammad was reported as saying, "He was killed by the virtuous man Fayruz b. al-Daylami." Fayruz died during the caliphate of Uthman.

See also
List of non-Arab Sahabah

References

External links
Biography from USC-MSA Compendium of Muslim Texts.

Daylamites
7th-century Iranian people
Sahabah hadith narrators